Letters to a Young Scientist is a 2013 book by E. O. Wilson. Included is the observation that one doesn't need to be brilliant at math to become a great scientist.

References

2013 non-fiction books
English-language books
Works by E. O. Wilson
Boni & Liveright books